Zurab Nadareishvili (born 4 January 1957) is a Georgian composer and academic.

Biography
Nadareishvili was born in Poti, Georgia,  where  he  went  to  primary  and  music  school. During  the  studies  at  the  conservatory  he  participated  in  students'  music  festivals  in  Georgia,  as  well  as  other  countries.

In 1987 he graduated from the conservatory  (Prof. Kvernadze’s class)  and  continued  post-graduate  study  again  under  his  guidance. 

In  1987  his  String  Quartet  was  awarded  a  First  Prize  at the Moscow All-Union Competition. After that it was successfully  performed  in  Saint Petersburg, Warsaw, Amsterdam and USA by  the Petersburg  String  Quartet.    

From 1987 Zurab  Nadareishvili has been a member of the Georgian  Composers’  Union. In 1996  he  became a board member  of  the Georgian  Composers’  Union.    		

In  1995   he  was  awarded  first  prize  by  the  Georgian  Composers’  Union  for  the   year’s  best  creation (Piano  Trio).  

In 1997 his "Variations for piano and orchestra" was awarded a III Prize at the Moscow Prokofiev International Competition.			 

In 1985 he married the physicist Nino Shavdia (born in 1963).They have two children (Nutza, born 1986; Georgi, born 1987).

List of Works

Pieces for piano (performed in Tbilisi 1982);

Three romances for voice and piano  (performed in Tbilisi 1982);

Sonata for violin and piano (performed in Tbilisi 1983);

Piece for clarinet and piano (performed in Tbilisi 1983);

Variations for piano (performed in Tbilisi 1983);

Four pieces for string quartet (performed in Tbilisi 1984);

Music for 13 strings;

Wind quintet (recorded by Georgian Radio 1985);

String quartet N 1 (performed in Tbilisi 1987 by Georgian Radio String  Quartet in Petersburg 1989, in Amsterdam 1995, in USA 1996, by Petersburg String Quartet);

Symphonic poem (performed in Tbilisi 1988, in Gorky (Russia) 1988);

Piano quintet N 1 (performed in Tbilisi 1989, in USA 1995/97, in Osaka (Japan) 1999);

Piano trio (performed in Tbilisi  1994, in USA 2003);

Variations  for piano and orchestra (performed in Tbilisi  1998);

"Aphaniptera and formicidae" - chamber opera, based on a Georgian folk-tale (recorded by “Kvali” Film Studio, Tbilisi 1996); 

"Chants" - for nine instruments (recorded by Georgian Radio 1993);

"Mon Plaisir" - for six instruments (performed in Tbilisi 2000); 

"Rhapsody" - for guitar and string quartet (performed in USA 2003); 

 String Quartet No 2 (2002); 

"Dance" - for flute, clarinet, vibraphone and guitar (performed in Baku 2003); 

"Litany" (2003) for strings, percussions and tape (performed in Tbilisi 2012); 

Piano quintet No 2 (2005) (performed in Osaka (Japan) 1999);

"Phoenix" – for piano, string quartet and tape (2005);

"Pastorale" – for recorder, flute, oboe, soprano saxophone and harpsichord (2005); 

"Nuages" – for Orchestra(2006). Performed in Tbilisi  (2012);

"Dialogue-Contrasts" -  for flute, string trio, piano and tape (2007). Performed in Tbilisi and in Fribourg by Ensemble "Recherche" (2007);

"Rendezvous" – for oboe solo. Performed in Tbilisi (2010);

"Cadenza" – for viola solo. Performed in Tbilisi (2010);

2 movements – for oboe, clarinet, bassoon and piano. Performed in USA (2010);

Etude (Tarantella) – for piano. Performed in USA (2010); 

"Life is a dream" – 2-act Opera on own libretto (2000-20014); 

"Pot-pourri" – for 3 pianos and 16 hands (2014). Performed in Tbilisi (2014);

Incidental music for plays and films.

References

1957 births
Classical composers from Georgia (country)
Living people